Bicyclus saussurei, the white-banded bush brown or Saussure's bush brown, is a butterfly in the family Nymphalidae. It is found in Nigeria, Cameroon, Angola, the Democratic Republic of the Congo, Sudan, Uganda, Rwanda, Burundi, Kenya, Tanzania and Zambia. The habitat consists of dense sub-montane forests.

The larvae feed on Poaceae species.

Subspecies
Bicyclus saussurei saussurei (highlands of Angola, southern and central Democratic Republic of the Congo, Zambia)
Bicyclus saussurei angustus Condamin, 1970 (Democratic Republic of the Congo: Kivu, southern Sudan, Uganda, Rwanda, Burundi, western Kenya, north-western Tanzania)
Bicyclus saussurei camerunia (Strand, 1914) (eastern Nigeria, Cameroon)

References

Elymniini
Butterflies described in 1879
Butterflies of Africa
Taxa named by Hermann Dewitz